Javier  may refer to:

Arts, entertainment, and media
 Javier, in video game Advance Wars: Dual Strike
 Javier Rios, a character in the Monsters, Inc. franchise.
 Javier (album), a 2003 album by the American singer Javier Colon, known as Javier

People
 Javier (name)

Places
 Javier, Spain
 Javier, Leyte, Philippines

See also
 Hurricane Javier (disambiguation)
 San Javier (disambiguation)
 Xavier (disambiguation)
 Xavier (given name)
 Xavier (surname)